Takamoa Theological College is a Bible school located in Rarotonga, Cook Islands. It was founded by the noted Congregationalist missionary Aaron Buzacott (1800–1864). It offers a Diploma of Theology and a Certificate of Bible Studies. The college trains pastors for the Cook Islands Christian Church.  It has 23 branches in the Cook Islands, 20 in New Zealand, and 12 in Australia.

One of its most distinguished graduates was Ruatoka (1846?–1903), a pioneering missionary to Papua New Guinea.

References

External links 
Official website
Cook Islands Herald Online, 25 November 2009, 'Takamoa graduates 10 student pastors' 

Evangelical seminaries and theological colleges
Buildings and structures in the Cook Islands
Christianity in the Cook Islands
Rarotonga
19th-century establishments in the Cook Islands
Educational institutions established in the 19th century
Universities and colleges in the Cook Islands